Valley Township is a township in Ellsworth County, Kansas, USA.  As of the 2000 census, its population was 577.

Geography

Transportation
Valley Township contains one airport or landing strip, Holyrood Municipal Airport.

References
 USGS Geographic Names Information System (GNIS)

External links
 US-Counties.com
 City-Data.com

Townships in Ellsworth County, Kansas
Townships in Kansas